The Echoing River is a river in the Hudson Bay drainage basin in Manitoba and Ontario, Canada. Its flows from its source at Echoing Lake in the unorganized part of Kenora District, Northwestern Ontario to its mouth as a right tributary of the Gods River in Northern Manitoba. The Gods River flows via the Hayes River to Hudson Bay.

The First Nations community of Shamattawa is at the river's mouth.

Tributaries
Peckinow River (right)
Wapikani River (left)
Pechabau River (right)
Sturgeon River (right)
Isquitao Creek (right)
North Wanitawagao Creek (right)
South Wanitawagao Creek (right)
Pasquatchai River (right)
Saketchekaw River (left)
Kakitayoamisk River (left)
Brice Creek (left)
Ellard River (right)
Ney River (left)
Hanson River (right)

See also
List of rivers of Manitoba
List of rivers of Ontario

References

Rivers of Northern Manitoba
Rivers of Kenora District
Tributaries of Hudson Bay